Leon Louis Francoise Bazin (28 June 1907 – 7 December 1964) was an Australian rules footballer who played with Footscray in the Victorian Football League (VFL).		
		
Bazin played seven senior matches with Victorian Football Association (VFA) club Camberwell in 1927 and 1928 and later played for fellow VFA club Sandringham.

Notes

External links 
		

1907 births
1964 deaths
Australian rules footballers from Melbourne
Western Bulldogs players
Sandringham Football Club players
Camberwell Football Club players
People from Carlton, Victoria